Sir Richard O'Brien,  (15 February 1920 – 11 December 2009) was a British engineer, industrial relations expert, civil servant, and decorated British Army officer. He was Chairman of the Manpower Services Commission from 1976 to 1982, Chairman of the Archbishop of Canterbury’s Commission on Urban Priority Areas that published the controversial Faith in the City report in 1985, and Chairman of the Policy Studies Institute from 1984 to 1990.

Early life
O'Brien was born on 15 February 1920 in Chesterfield, Derbyshire, England. He was the only child of Charles O'Brien (1886–1952), a doctor, and his wife, Marjorie Maude (1892–1977). His father was an Irish immigrant who served in the British Army during World War I and was awarded the Military Cross.

He was educated at Oundle School, then an all-boys private school in Oundle, Northamptonshire. In 1938, he matriculated into Clare College, Cambridge to study law. His degree was shortened from three years to two because of the outbreak of World War II in 1939. He graduated with a Bachelor of Arts (BA) degree in 1940.

References

1920 births
2009 deaths
United Kingdom industrial relations
British civil servants
English Anglicans
People from Chesterfield, Derbyshire
People educated at Oundle School
Alumni of Clare College, Cambridge
Companions of the Distinguished Service Order
Royal Leicestershire Regiment officers
Recipients of the Military Cross
Sherwood Foresters officers
Knights Bachelor
British Army personnel of World War II
English people of Irish descent
20th-century British engineers